Breaking New Ground is the debut studio album by American country music band Wild Rose. Originally issued in 1988 via Universal Records, it was rereleased on April 9, 1990 via Capitol Records. The album includes the singles "Breaking New Ground" and "Go Down Swingin'".

Critical reception
Giving it a "B", Alanna Nash of Entertainment Weekly wrote that "the band offers a kicky program of country-rock, bluegrass, Texas swing, Louisiana spice, honky-tonk, and jazzy 'dawg' music…Little of this is combined into a cohesive sound, but whatever Wild Rose is, it's never boring."

Track listing

Personnel
Compiled from liner notes.
Wild Rose
 Pam Gadd – lead vocals, background vocals, banjo, acoustic guitar
 Nancy Given Prout – drums, background vocals
 Kathy Mac – bass guitar, background vocals
 Pam Perry – lead vocals, background vocals, mandolin, acoustic guitar
 Wanda Vick – electric guitar, fiddle, Dobro, pedal steel guitar, lap steel guitar, mandolin, acoustic guitar

Additional musicians
 Pat Flynn – acoustic guitar
 Sonny Garrish – pedal steel guitar
 Carl Jackson – acoustic guitar
 John Barlow Jarvis – piano
 Randy McCormick – piano
 Bobbe Seymour – pedal steel guitar
 "Hurricane" James Stroud – percussion

Technical
 Milan Bogdan – digital editing
 John Guess – mixing
 Glenn Meadows – mastering
 James Stroud – production
 Ron Treat – digital recording, overdubbing
 Wild Rose – arranging

Chart performance

References

1990 debut albums
Wild Rose (band) albums
Capitol Records albums
Albums produced by James Stroud
Universal Records (1988) albums